The Fabled City is the second studio album by The Nightwatchman, the alter ego of Tom Morello. It was released on September 30, 2008.

The album was released under the Nightwatchman's new full title: Tom Morello: The Nightwatchman.

Serj Tankian (of System of a Down), Shooter Jennings, and Perry Farrell (of Jane's Addiction) are featured guests on the album, which was produced by Brendan O'Brien (Pearl Jam, Rage Against the Machine, Audioslave).

On August 8, 2008, the track 'Whatever It Takes' was released on The Nightwatchman's MySpace. On October 25, the bonus track "Shake My Shit" (featuring Perry Farrell) was released on Morello's Myspace page.

Critical reception

Media reception to The Fabled City was generally favorable; aggregating website Metacritic reported a rating of 61% in December 2009 based on 11 critical reviews.

Track listing

Bonus Disc Track listing

Personnel
The Nightwatchman (Tom Morello) - vocals, guitar
Serj Tankian - additional vocals on "Lazarus on Down"
Shooter Jennings - additional vocals on "The Iron Wheel"
Perry Farrell - additional vocals on "Shake My Shit"
Daniel Laufer - cello on "Night Falls" and "Lazarus on Down"
Brendan O'Brien - various instruments

References

2008 albums
Albums produced by Brendan O'Brien (record producer)
The Nightwatchman albums
Epic Records albums